Leptomeryx is an extinct genus of ruminant of the family Leptomerycidae, endemic to North America during the Eocene through Oligocene 38–24.8 Mya, existing for approximately . It was a small deer-like ruminant with somewhat slender body.

Fossil distribution
Sites and species recovered:
Titus Canyon, Inyo County, California (L.blacki) ~30.6—33.9 Ma.
UNSM Sx-8 (Orella C), Sioux County, Nebraska (L. elissae) ~33.9—24.8 Ma.
Anxiety Butte, Saskatchewan, Canada (L. sp., L. evansi) ~38—24.8 Ma.
Calf Creek, Saskatchewan, Canada, (L. mammifer) ~38—33.3 Ma.
Toadstool Park, Sioux County, Nebraska (L. speciosus) ~37.2—33.3 Ma.
Medicine Pole Hills, Bowman County, North Dakota (L. yoderi) ~38—33.9 Ma.

References

 Webb, S.D., 1998. Hornless ruminants. pp. 463–476 in C.M. Janis, K.M. Scott, and L.L. Jacobs (eds.) Evolution of Tertiary Mammals of North America. Volume 1: Terrestrial Carnivores, Ungulates, and Ungulatelike Mammals. Cambridge University Press, Cambridge. 
 Heaton, T.H. and Emry, R.J., 1996. Leptomerycidae pp. 581–608 in D.R. Prothero and R.J. Emry (eds.) The Terrestrial Eocene-Oligocene Transition in North America. Cambridge University Press, Cambridge.

Eocene even-toed ungulates
Oligocene even-toed ungulates
Eocene mammals of North America
Oligocene mammals of North America
White River Fauna
Eocene United States
Paleogene United States
Eocene genus first appearances
Chattian genus extinctions
Fossil taxa described in 1853
Prehistoric even-toed ungulate genera